Margaret Court defeated Chris Evert in the final, 6–7(5–7), 7–6(8–6), 6–4 to win the women's singles tennis title at the 1973 French Open. It was Evert's first French Open appearance.

Billie Jean King was the reigning champion, but chose not to defend her title.

This tournament marked the first singles major appearance of future world No. 1 and 18-time major singles champion Martina Navratilova; she reached the quarterfinals before being defeated by Evonne Goolagong.

Seeds
The seeded players are listed below. Margaret Court is the champion; others show the round in which they were eliminated.

 Margaret Court (champion)
 Chris Evert (finalist)
 Virginia Wade (third round)
 Evonne Goolagong (semifinals)
 Nancy Gunter (third round)
 Françoise Dürr (semifinals)
 Helga Masthoff (quarterfinals)
 Katja Ebbinghaus (quarterfinals)

Qualifying

Draw

Finals

Earlier rounds

Section 1

Section 2

Section 3

Section 4

References

External links
1973 French Open – Women's draws and results at the International Tennis Federation

Women's Singles
French Open by year – Women's singles
French Open - Women's Singles
1973 in women's tennis
1973 in French women's sport